The 2019 OFC Men's Olympic Qualifying Tournament (also called the 2019 OFC U-23 Championship) was the eighth edition of the OFC Men's Olympic Qualifying Tournament, the quadrennial international age-restricted football championship organised by the Oceania Football Confederation (OFC) for the men's under-23 national teams of Oceania.

In November 2018, it was announced that Fiji would host the competition. The tournament was held from 21 September to 5 October 2019.

The winner qualified as the OFC representative at the 2020 Summer Olympics men's football tournament in Japan.

New Zealand won the title after defeating Solomon Islands in the final. Vanuatu finished third, and defending champions Fiji finished fourth.

Teams
Eight of the 11 FIFA-affiliated national teams from the OFC entered the tournament.

Did not enter

Note: New Caledonia and Tahiti are not members of the International Olympic Committee and thus not eligible to qualify for the Olympic Football Tournament.

Venues

Squads

Players born on or after 1 January 1997 were eligible to compete in the tournament.

Draw
The draw of the tournament was held on 6 May 2019 at the OFC Academy in Auckland, New Zealand. The eight teams were drawn into two groups of four teams. The top two ranked teams, New Zealand and Fiji, were assigned to group positions A1 and B1 respectively, and the next two ranked teams, Vanuatu and Solomon Islands, were drawn into position 2 of Group A or B, while the remaining teams were drawn into position 3 or 4 of Group A or B.

Group stage
The top two teams of each group advanced to the semi-finals.

All times are local, FJT (UTC+12).

Group A

Group B

Knockout stage

Bracket

Semi-finals

Third place match

Final
Winner qualifies for 2020 Summer Olympics.

Qualified team for the Summer Olympics
The following team from the OFC qualified for the 2020 Summer Olympic men's football tournament.

1 Bold indicates champions for that year. Italic indicates hosts for that year.

Goalscorers
12 goals
 Myer Bevan

8 goals
 Ben Waine

5 goals
 Augustine Waita

4 goals

 Logan Rogerson
 Azariah Soromon

3 goals

 Patrick Joseph
 Clayton Lewis
 Gregory Togubai
 Michael Tumua Leo
 Adrian Mara
 Patrick Taroga
 Bong Kalo

2 goals

 Savenaca Baledrokadroka
 Freddy Kepo
 Darold Kakasi
 Hemaloto Polovili

1 goal

 Bruce Hughes
 Mohammed Shah
 Tito Vodowaqa
 Noah Billingsley
 Dylan de Jong
 Callan Elliot
 Billy Jones
 Ollie Whyte
 Bernard Purari
 Emmanuel Simongi
 Ronnie Bourne
 Samuelu Malo
 Osa Savelio
 Tuita Maeobia
 Claude Aru
 Jesse Kalopong
 Bethuel Ollie
 Johnathan Spokeyjack
 Jordy Tasip
 Ronaldo Wilkins

Own goal

 Mahe Malafu (playing against Papua New Guinea)
 Scott Wara (playing against New Zealand)

References

External links
OFC Men's Olympic Qualifier 2019
News > OFC Men's Olympic Qualifier 2019, OceaniaFootball.com

2019
Football at the 2020 Summer Olympics – Men's qualification
2019 in youth association football
Men's Olympic Qualifying Tournament
International association football competitions hosted by Fiji
2019 in Fijian football
September 2019 sports events in Oceania
October 2019 sports events in Oceania